Long Pine is a city in Brown County, Nebraska, United States. The population was 305 at the 2010 census.

History
Long Pine was founded circa 1876, and grew quickly when the railroad was extended to the settlement in 1881. It took its name from nearby Long Pine Creek.

Long Pine was a hub for the Chicago and North Western Transportation Company on what came to be known as the Cowboy Line and at one time held a large roundhouse, turntable, and servicing facility.  With the advent of diesel locomotives, the steam servicing facilities were no longer needed and were moved elsewhere.  Eventually, the entire line was abandoned and the last train came through the town in 1992.  The former right of way has since become a recreational trail known as the Cowboy Trail.

Geography
Long Pine is located at  (42.535878, -99.702790).

The city is bisected by Long Pine Creek, Nebraska's longest self-sustaining trout stream.

Demographics

2010 census
At the 2010 census there were 305 people in 145 households, including 82 families, in the city. The racial makeup of the city was 100.0% White. Hispanic or Latino of any race were 0.3%.

Of the 145 households 25.5% had children under the age of 18 living with them, 48.3% were married couples living together, 6.2% had a female householder with no husband present, 2.1% had a male householder with no wife present, and 43.4% were non-families. 41.4% of households were one person and 22.1% were one person aged 65 or older. The average household size was 2.10 and the average family size was 2.87.

The median age was 45.6 years. 24.3% of residents were under the age of 18; 3.6% were between the ages of 18 and 24; 21.2% were from 25 to 44; 26.9% were from 45 to 64; and 23.9% were 65 or older. The gender makeup of the city was 47.9% male and 52.1% female.

2000 census
At the 2000 census there were 341 people in 154 households, including 95 families, in the city. The population density was 589.8 people per square mile (227.0/km). There were 221 housing units at an average density of 382.2 per square mile (147.1/km).  The racial makeup of the city was 99.12% White, 0.29% Asian, and 0.59% from two or more races. Hispanic or Latino of any race were 1.47%.

Of the 154 households 25.3% had children under the age of 18 living with them, 52.6% were married couples living together, 6.5% had a female householder with no husband present, and 37.7% were non-families. 32.5% of households were one person and 16.9% were one person aged 65 or older. The average household size was 2.21 and the average family size was 2.80.

The age distribution was 25.2% under the age of 18, 4.1% from 18 to 24, 23.8% from 25 to 44, 25.8% from 45 to 64, and 21.1% 65 or older. The median age was 43 years. For every 100 females, there were 96.0 males. For every 100 females age 18 and over, there were 91.7 males.

The median household income was $25,156, and the median family income  was $26,979. Males had a median income of $25,625 versus $15,972 for females. The per capita income for the city was $12,863. About 13.9% of families and 17.1% of the population were below the poverty line, including 24.5% of those under age 18 and 10.7% of those age 65 or over.

Notable person
 Cliff Clevenger, United States Representative from Ohio from 1939-1959; born on a ranch near Long Pine

Cultural allusions
 Long Pine is mentioned in Willa Cather's 1911 short story The Joy of Nelly Deane.

References

External links
 Official website
 

Cities in Brown County, Nebraska
Cities in Nebraska